Kong is a town in northern Ivory Coast. It is a sub-prefecture of and the seat of Kong Department in Tchologo Region, Savanes District. Kong is also a commune. It was the capital of the Kong Empire (1710–1895).

Natural history
Kong is in the sub-Saharan Sahel–tropical Savanna belt biogeography region, of grasslands with trees, such as the baobab (Adansonia digitata),  shea (Vitellaria paradoxa) and other species. Comoé National Park is to the east.

History
Kong emerged as a trading centre when Mali Empire merchants began trading in the territory of the surrounding Senufo people. The sub-prefecture of Kong, in the area of Kong to Dabakala, is said to be the "origin" area, where Mandé ethnic group traders known as the Dioula–Juula migrated from the Niger basin to settle in the 12th century.

The Juula traders brought with them their trading skills and connections, and transformed Kong into an African international market for the exchange of northern desert goods, such as salt and cloth, and southern forest exports such as cola nuts, gold, and slaves.

As Kong grew prosperous from trade its early rulers from the Taraweré clan combined Juula and Senufo traditions, and extended their authority over the surrounding region.

Kong Empire

In 1710, Seku Ouattara (Wattara), a Dioula warrior, invaded the area and conquered the city of Kong with his cavalry. He established himself as ruler and, under his authority, the city rose from a small city-state to the capital of the great Kong Empire. It held sway over much of the region for over 150 years.

19th century
In 1881, Samory Touré expanded his Wassoulou Empire in conquering the Kong Empire, and destroyed much of the city of Kong. In 1898 the Kong region and city then came under French colonial control, within the French West Africa colony created in 1893.

Features
Despite the Kong Empire's fall from power, their 17th century landmark Kong Friday Mosque survived. In the 20th century, Kong was largely rebuilt in a traditional earthen Sahelian architecture style. It features a Qur'anic school and distinctive baked mud mosque buildings. The Grand Mosque of Kong and another, smaller mosque within the city are inscribed on the UNESCO World Heritage List because of their traditional architectural style.  

The far north-eastern portion of the sub-prefecture is within the borders of Comoé National Park.

In 2014, the population of the sub-prefecture of Kong was 29,190.

Villages
The 18 villages of the sub-prefecture of Kong and their population in 2014 are:

References

Bibliography

 Baumann, Gerd (2004) Grammars of Identity/Alterity: A Structural Approach
 Appiah, Kwame (2003) Africana: The Concise Desk Reference
 Forrest, Joshua (2004) Subnationalism in Africa: Ethnicity, Alliances, and Politics

Sub-prefectures of Tchologo
Communes of Tchologo